Robertson Boulevard is a street in Los Angeles, in the U.S. state of California, that also passes through the incorporated cities of West Hollywood, Beverly Hills, and Culver City.

Location
Robertson Boulevard is a major north–south thoroughfare on the Westside of Los Angeles running through one of its neighborhoods, Pico-Robertson and between two of its neighborhoods, Beverlywood and Crestview. Its northern end is slightly to the north of Santa Monica Boulevard at Keith Avenue in West Hollywood and its southern end is at Washington Boulevard in Culver City. Robertson Boulevard is accessible via exit #6 on the Santa Monica Freeway (Interstate 10).

Overview
The northern part of the street in West Hollywood and Beverly Hills is a trendy tree-lined shopping district. In West Hollywood, the neighborhood surrounding Robertson Boulevard consists mostly of high-density apartment buildings and condominiums. The residential area surrounding the Robertson Boulevard shopping district in Beverly Hills is more family-oriented and is made up mostly of single-family residences.

Robertson Boulevard has recently become a haven for celebrities and paparazzi. This is partially due to a large influx of unique boutiques and designer clothing & jewelry stores such as Agnes B, Curve, Lisa Kline, Kitson Boutique, Williams Sonoma, Armani Exchange, Michael Kors, Ralph Lauren, Ted Baker, M·A·C, Chanel, Gypsy05, Intermix, Tory Burch, Max Azria,  Beach Bunny Swimwear, and Erica Courtney (right next door to The Ivy) which is a mecca for many celebrity shoppers. In addition, several popular celebrity-infused eateries are located on Robertson Boulevard, such as The Ivy. The Kabbalah Centre is also located on the street.

South of West Hollywood and Beverly Hills and north of Culver City, Pico-Robertson, Beverlywood and Crestview are upper-middle-class neighborhoods in West Los Angeles with a historical and substantial Jewish population. Alexander Hamilton High School, a highly diverse high school in the Beverlywood neighborhood in West Los Angeles is on Robertson Boulevard.

The southern terminus of Robertson Boulevard is Washington Boulevard in Culver City, where it then continues as Higuera Street (which itself later becomes Obama Boulevard).

The Robertson Branch of Los Angeles Public Library is located at 1719 S. Robertson near the intersection of Airdrome.

Public transportation
Metro Local line 617 runs along Robertson Boulevard.  The Metro E Line operates a rail station at Venice Boulevard.

References

Streets in Los Angeles
Streets in Los Angeles County, California
Boulevards in the United States
Culver City, California
Streets in West Hollywood, California
Westside (Los Angeles County)
Economy of Los Angeles
West Los Angeles